Tata Marcopolo (officially Tata Marcopolo Motors Ltd.) is a bus and coach manufacturing company headquartered in Karnataka, India and a joint venture between Tata Motors and Marcopolo S.A.

Tata Motors will buy the 49 percent stake held by its partner Marcopolo in the bus-making joint venture for  crore bringing curtains to the 14-year old partnership and paving the way for a smooth exit for the Brazilian company. The deal expected to be completed by February 2021.The subsidiary will continue with the ‘Marcopolo’ trademark for a minimum of three years with a non-compete provision in India for a corresponding period.

Operations
The primary bus manufacturing and building unit started in Lucknow, Uttar Pradesh, with an output of 8 buses per day. A second production facility is at Dharwad, Karnataka, whose output is 70 buses per day. Currently it has doubled its production and become the largest unit in the world.
Tata Marcopolo buses were seen on the BUS WORLD exhibition too. And it was able to get customers and viewers attention.
Recently, Tata Marcopolo came with the Y1 electrical buses. which is a commercial success.
The company received 300 bus orders from some state governments of India, each bus costing around  crore.

Sales 
Tata Marcopolo products are being used or inducted in several Indian cities as part of the local transports fleet like Navi Mumbai, Ahmedabad, Delhi, Bengaluru, Coimbatore, Mysuru, Kolkata, Chennai, Lucknow, Kanpur, Chandigarh, Pune, Nagpur, South Kanpur, Kochi, Madurai, Naya Raipur, Indore, Hyderabad, Thane, Thiruvananthapuram, Visakhapatnam, Vijayawada, Amritsar, Amaravati, etc.
It is a low-floor bus with both air-conditioned and non air-conditioned variants available.

The non air-conditioned variants is used by Kerala State Road Transport Corporation.

Gallery

See also 

 List of buses

References

Tata buses